Brent Parks Constabulary was a small, specialised constabulary responsible for patrolling the parks and open spaces parks and open spaces of the London Borough of Brent. Staff of the Borough Security Department were sworn in as constables from 1979, though the title "Brent Parks Constabulary" was adopted around 1993. In 1993, the constabulary consisted of 17 constables and 2 supervisors. They did not receive any formal police training, which "caused some concern" in the Metropolitan Police.

See also
Law enforcement in the United Kingdom
List of defunct law enforcement agencies in the United Kingdom

References

Parks and open spaces in the London Borough of Brent
Defunct park police forces of the United Kingdom